is a puzzle video game developed  and published by Micronet in 1990  under license by Konami. Using a variety of sliding puzzles, the player rolls a ball (possibly containing a small armadillo character, as implied by the game's introduction) along tracks set on tiles. Players must align the tracks together and make the ball roll over bridged tracks, set on the border of the puzzle in order to complete each level. Junction has a total of 50 levels which the player can select at random, but a certain number of points have to be reached by level 50, in order for the player to beat the game and see the ending.

Junction is similar in design to Konami's Loco-Motion arcade game from 1982, but with isometric graphics.

References

External links
 Junction (Game Gear) at GameFAQs
 Junction (Sega Genesis) at GameFAQs

1990 video games
Game Gear games
Micronet co., Ltd. games
Puzzle video games
Sega Genesis games
Single-player video games
Video games developed in Japan
Video games with isometric graphics